Yaren may refer to: 

 Yaren District (or Yaren), the de facto capital of Nauru
 Yaren Constituency, an electoral constituency of Nauru
 Yaren, İvrindi, a village in Türkiye
 Yaren, a Turkish folk music instrument created by Özay Gönlüm
 Aylin Yaren (b. 1989), a Turkish-German female soccer player
 Yaren (stork), a stork popularly known for its friendship with a fisherman in Turkey.